Rihaniyeh   (also  Rihaniyet) is a village in Akkar Governorate, Lebanon.

The population  is mostly Alawite.

History
In 1838, Eli Smith noted  the village as er-Rihaniyeh,  located east of esh-Sheikh Mohammed. The  residents were Alawites.

References

Bibliography

External links
Rihaniyeh, Localiban 

Populated places in Akkar District